The 2005–06 A1 Grand Prix of Nations, United States of America was an A1 Grand Prix race, held on the weekend of March 12, 2006 at Laguna Seca.

Report 
The first American stop for the A1GP (and so far only) was doomed to fail from the start. The race was announced before Laguna Seca announced it. There was little to no advertisement for the event, and very few fans of European open wheel racing in America even knew about the event. Due to constant rain, the A1GP weekend was canceled by the track a week before the race. The rain stopped, but the ground was still soaked to the point that most of the parking lots were closed in fear of vehicles getting stuck in the mud. Laguna Seca is located just a few miles from the Monterey Bay, and is at an elevation of about 750 feet. The weather chased away more fans as snow fell on Friday night.

Fewer than 2000 people (estimate) attended the race.

Qualifying
Qualifying was held in "ideal" conditions compared to the rest of the weekend and the lap times were quick.

Sprint race
With rain nearby, officials changed the start times for both races. Temperatures were in the 40s, and the diehard fans were in for quite a show. Less than five minutes before the start, a torrent rain storm hit the track hard. Teams quickly switched to rain tires and put on a great show. By the halfway point of the 30 minute sprint race, the rain stopped, yet there was enough water that a dry line could not be found.

Main race
By the start of the main race, the track was mostly dry, however there were enough wet spots on the track to make it dangerous for slicks. Many cars spun hitting the wet curbs. There were also some questionable calls by the officials causing Jos Verstappen to storm out of his car in the middle of the race.

Results

Qualifying Results 
Qualifying took place on Saturday, March 11, 2006.

1. Mexico Salvador Duran 2min 30.744secs
2. France Nicolas Lapierre 2min 30.895secs
3. New Zealand Matt Halliday 2min 31.596secs
4. Malaysia Alex Yoong 2min 31.810secs
5. Australia Ryan Briscoe 2min 31.964secs
6. Great Britain Robbie Kerr 2min 31.970secs
7. Portugal Alvaro Parente 2min 32.042secs
8. Ireland Ralph Firman 2min 32.098secs
9. Germany Timo Scheider 2min 32.307secs
10. South Africa Stephen Simpson 2min 32.535secs
11. Lebanon Graham Rahal 2min 32.560secs
12. Netherlands Jos Verstappen 2min 32.571secs
13. Italy Max Papis 2min 32.745secs
14. Czech Republic Tomáš Enge 2min 32.838secs
15. Indonesia Ananda Mikola 2min 33.249secs
16. Switzerland Giorgio Mondini 2min 33.299secs
17. USA Bryan Herta 2min 33.602secs
18. Canada Patrick Carpentier 2min 33.641secs
19. Brazil Christian Fittipaldi 2min 33.686secs
20. Austria Mathias Lauda 2min 34.338secs
21. Pakistan Adam Khan 2min 36.325secs
22. China Tengyi Jiang 2min 37.715secs

Sprint Race Results 
The Sprint Race took place on Sunday, March 12, 2006.

Main Race Results 
The Main Race took place on Sunday, March 12, 2006.

1. Mexico Salvador Duran 1 h 0 min 52.974 s; 40 laps
2. Germany Timo Scheider +2.042 s
3. Great Britain Robbie Kerr +3.117 s
4. Portugal Alvaro Parente +10.420 s
5. Canada Patrick Carpentier +14.183 s
6. Ireland Ralph Firman +20.805 s
7. Italy Max Papis +23.199 s
8. Australia Ryan Briscoe +24.236 s
9. Austria Mathias Lauda +29.229 s
10. Malaysia Alex Yoong +30.072 s
11. Pakistan Adam Khan +31.391 s
12. New Zealand Matt Halliday +31.977 s
13. Switzerland Giorgio Mondini +2 laps
14. France Nicolas Lapierre +3 laps
15. USA Bryan Herta +3 laps
16. Czech Republic Tomáš Enge +6 laps
17. China Tengyi Jiang +7 laps
18. Brazil Christian Fittipaldi +11 laps
19. Indonesia Ananda Mikola +12 laps
20. Lebanon Graham Rahal +13 laps
21. Netherlands Jos Verstappen +23 laps
22. South Africa Stephen Simpson +37 laps

United States of America
A1 Grand Prix